Valenzuela is a genus of psocoptera in the family Caeciliusidae, the lizard barklice. Some species are extinct and date to the Eocene of Poland or Russia. There are at least 300 described species in Valenzuela.

See also
 List of Valenzuela species

References

 Mockford, E.L. 1999: A classification of the psocopteran family Caeciliusidae (Caeciliidae auct.) Transactions of the American Entomological Society, 125(4): 325-417.

External links 
 
 
 
 
 Valenzuela at insectoid.info

Caeciliusidae
Psocomorpha genera